The Mercury Tower is a high-rise building under construction in St. Julian's, Malta. The building will have 32 floors of mixed residential and hotel space. This development is one of the last concept designs signed off by Iraqi-British architect Zaha Hadid personally before her death in 2016.

The most iconic feature of the building is the twisted area between levels 9 and 11 that will provide its distinctive appearance. The tower's design is partially integrated into the former Mercury House, which had been built in 1903 to house the country's telecoms infrastructure. This building is a Grade II listed structure, and is currently being restored and reinvented as part of the project.

See also 
 List of tallest buildings in Malta

References

External links 

Skyscrapers in Malta